Siemianów may refer to the following places in Poland:
Siemianów, Lower Silesian Voivodeship (south-west Poland)
Siemianów, Łódź Voivodeship (central Poland)